Wahalak Creek is a stream in the U.S. state of Mississippi. It is a tributary to the Noxubee River.

Wahalak is a name derived from the Choctaw language purported to mean "to branch out, to spread, pronged". Variant names are "Wahorlock Creek", "Warloc Creek", and "Warloe Creek".

References

Rivers of Mississippi
Rivers of Kemper County, Mississippi
Rivers of Noxubee County, Mississippi
Mississippi placenames of Native American origin